Chakma may refer to:

Chakma people, a Tibeto-Burman people of Bangladesh and Northeast India
Chakma language, the Indo-European language spoken by them
Chakma script
Chakma (Unicode block)